Above Church is a hamlet about  northwest of Ipstones in the English county of Staffordshire.

References

Hamlets in Staffordshire